The Florida Journal of International Law is a law review established in 1984 devoted to timely discussion of international legal issues. Recent articles have treated subjects as varied as international trade and commerce law, human rights law, terrorism, national security, war crimes, international environmental law, international intellectual property, and maritime law. It is published three times a year and is student-run. The journal is based at the University of Florida Levin College of Law.

External links
 
University of Florida College of Law homepage

University of Florida
American law journals
Publications established in 1984
English-language journals
International law journals
Triannual journals
1984 establishments in Florida